The second season of Mestre do Sabor premiered on Thursday, April 30, 2020, at  (BRT / AMT) on TV Globo. 

Actress Monique Alfradique joined the show as a new co-host, replacing Maria Joana. In addition, the team sizes were reduced from eight to six.

Due to the COVID-19 pandemic, master José Avillez decided to left the show midway through filming of the season in order to travel to Lisbon, where he resides, to be quarantined with his family. As a result, he was replaced by Rafael Costa e Silva for the remaining of the season.

On March 12, 2020, TV Globo suspended all live audiences for their shows due to the pandemic in Brazil, shifting the season into a less-crowded production for its final weeks of shooting. Taping was completed on March 20, 2020.

On July 23, 2020, Dário Costa from Team Kátia won the competition over Ana Zambelli (Team Leo), Junior Marinho (Team Kátia) and Serginho Jucá (Team Leo), and took home the grand prize of R$250.000.

Dário previously competed on the first season of MasterChef Profissionais in 2016, but was eliminated in the semifinals, finishing in third place.

Teams
Key
 Winner
 Runner-up
 Eliminated

Blind tests
 Key

Pressure tests

The Duels
 Key

Wildcard
 Key

Elimination chart
Key

Week 1: Quarterfinals

Week 2: Semifinals

Week 3: Finals

Ratings and reception

Brazilian ratings
All numbers are in points and provided by Kantar Ibope Media.

References

External links
 Mestre do Sabor on Gshow.com

2020 Brazilian television seasons
Television productions postponed due to the COVID-19 pandemic